Popular socialism or people's socialism is a distinct form of socialism in various countries.

Nordic countries
Popular socialism or people's socialism (Danish: Folkesocialisme) is a distinct socialist current in the Nordic countries.

In that context the term can be said to represent a distinct ideological tendency, originating from Aksel Larsen's split from the Communist Party of Denmark in 1956. Larsen founded the Socialist People's Party (SF), which placed itself between communism and social democracy. In Norway a similar party, the Socialist People's Party, was formed by an anti-NATO/anti–European Economic Community split from the Labour Party and later became the backbone of Socialist Left Party (SV). Today, both the Danish SF and the Norwegian SV identify their ideological base as 'popular socialism'. In Sweden the term has sometimes been used and there were at one point discussions within the rightist section of the Left Party on forming a political project with the Danish SF as a model, but the split was eventually avoided.

Inspired by green politics and democratic socialism, popular socialism places emphasis on grassroots democracy, social justice, and environmentalism. Popular socialist parties participate in democratic elections to gain popularity and influence policy, but do not consider the power of government as their primary goal, preferring to work within participatory systems on a local level.

United States

The American People's Party was a populist farmer-labor movement that advocated a progressive income tax, federal farm credit, the communization of railroads, telegraphs, and banks, the eight-hour workday, the right to form labor organizations, and other demands typical of popular socialist movements.

Eastern European countries
People's socialism in Eastern Europe originated in the 1890s as an effort to differentiate from traditional social democracy with basic ideological patterns modeled after those of the National-Social Association in Imperial Germany. The most prominent parties were the People's Socialist Party in the Kingdom of Yugoslavia, the Popular Socialists in the Russian Empire, and the "National Socialist", understood as "people's socialist", Czech National Social Party in Czechoslovakia. This Eastern European form is less leftist in ideological placement than in Nordic countries' form of socialism, strictly refusing Marxism, with certain revisionist elements. During the 1920s and 1930s, they were active as observer parties in the Labour and Socialist International but never became full members.

See also
 Democratic socialism
 Left-wing populism
 Nordic green left (disambiguation)
 Social democracy

References

Socialism in Europe
Socialism
Nordic politics
Left-wing populism